Crossroads 2: Live in the Seventies is the seventh live album and a box set by Eric Clapton, released in 1996. Unlike the first Crossroads box set that encompasses more than three decades of Clapton's work, Crossroads 2 is a chronicle of Clapton's live shows between 1974 through 1978. The album is largely focused on longer renditions of electric blues. Four studio outtakes are also included.

Track listing

Disc one
"Walkin' Down the Road" (Studio outtake) (Paul Levine, Alan Musgrove) – 5:15
Studio outtake recorded May 1974 at Criteria Studios, Miami for 461 Ocean Boulevard
"Have You Ever Loved a Woman" (Billy Myles) – 7:41
Recorded 19 July 1974 at the Long Beach Arena, Long Beach, California
"Willie and the Hand Jive/Get Ready" (Johhny Otis/Eric Clapton, Yvonne Elliman) – 11:42
"Can't Find My Way Home" (Steve Winwood) – 5:19
"Driftin' Blues/Ramblin' On My Mind" (Johnny Moore, Charles Brown, Eddie Williams/Robert Johnson) – 11:36
"Presence of the Lord" (Clapton) – 8:48
Tracks 3–6 recorded 20 July 1974 at the Long Beach Arena, Long Beach, California
"Rambling On My Mind/Have You Ever Loved a Woman" (Johnson/Myles) – 8:16
"Little Wing" (Jimi Hendrix) – 6:43
Tracks 7–8 recorded 4 December 1974 at the Hammersmith Odeon, Hammersmith, London, England
"The Sky Is Crying"/"Have You Ever Loved a Woman"/"Rambling on My Mind" (Elmore James/Myles/Johnson) – 7:39
Recorded 5 December 1974 at the Hammersmith Odeon, Hammersmith, London, England

Disc two
"Layla" (Clapton, Jim Gordon) – 5:38
"Further on Up the Road" (Joe Medwick, Don Robey) – 4:31
Tracks 1–2 recorded 25 June 1975 at the Providence Civic Center. Providence, Rhode Island
"I Shot the Sheriff" (Bob Marley) – 10:21
"Badge" (Clapton, George Harrison) – 10:42
Tracks 3–4 recorded 28 June 1975 at the Nassau Coliseum, Uniondale, New York
"Driftin' Blues" (Moore, Brown, Williams) – 6:58
"Eyesight to the Blind/Why Does Love Got to Be So Sad?" (with guitarist Carlos Santana) (Sonny Boy Williamson/Clapton, Bobby Whitlock) – 24:19 
Tracks 5–6 recorded 25 June 1975 at the Providence Civic Center. Providence, Rhode Island

Disc three
"Tell the Truth" (Clapton, Whitlock) – 8:57
"Knockin' on Heaven's Door" (Bob Dylan) – 5:20
"Stormy Monday" (T-Bone Walker) – 13:02
Tracks 1–3 recorded 27 April 1977 at the Hammersmith Odeon, Hammersmith, London, England
"Lay Down Sally" (Clapton, Marcy Levy, George Terry) – 5:23
Recorded 12 February 1978 at the Santa Monica Civic Auditorium, Santa Monica, California
"The Core" (Clapton, Levy) – 9:13
Recorded 11 February 1978 at the Santa Monica Civic Auditorium, Santa Monica, California
"We're All the Way" (Don Williams) – 2:55
"Cocaine" (J.J. Cale) – 6:37
Tracks 6-7 recorded 12 February 1978 at the Santa Monica Civic Auditorium, Santa Monica, California
"Goin' Down Slow/Ramblin' On My Mind" (St. Louis Jimmy Oden/Johnson) – 13:45
Recorded 11 February 1978 at the Santa Monica Civic Auditorium, Santa Monica, California
"Mean Old Frisco" (Arthur Crudup) – 5:53
Recorded 21 March 1978 at the Savannah Civic Center, Savannah, Georgia

Disc four
"Loving You Is Sweeter Than Ever" (Ivy Jo Hunter, Stevie Wonder) – 4:23
"Worried Life Blues" (Big Maceo Merriweather) – 5:58
Tracks 1-2, recorded 28 November 1978 at the Victoria Hall, Hanley, Staffordshire, Stoke-on-Trent, England
"Tulsa Time" (Danny Flowers) – 4:31
Recorded 24 November 1978 at the Apollo Theatre, Glasgow, Scotland
"Early in the Morning" (Traditional arranged by Eric Clapton) – 6:19
Recorded 28 November 1978 at the Victoria Hall, Hanley, Staffordshire, Stoke-on-Trent, England
"Wonderful Tonight" (Clapton) – 6:24
"Kind Hearted Woman" (Johnson) – 5:17
Tracks 5-6 recorded 24 November 1978 at the Apollo Theatre, Glasgow, Scotland
"Double Trouble" (Otis Rush) – 11:06
"Crossroads" (Johnson) – 5:20
Tracks 7-8 recorded 28 November 1978 at the Victoria Hall, Hanley, Staffordshire, Stoke-on-Trent, England
"To Make Somebody Happy" (Studio outtake) (Clapton) – 5:11
"Cryin'" (Studio outtake) (Clapton) – 2:54
"Water on the Ground" (Studio outtake) (Clapton) – 2:59
Tracks 9-11 are studio recordings, recorded 28 December 1978 at Olympic Studios, Barnes, London, England

References

External links 
 General info, Recording Locations
 
 [ Allmusic Review]

Eric Clapton compilation albums
1996 live albums
1996 compilation albums
Polydor Records compilation albums
Eric Clapton live albums
Polydor Records live albums